Fişek is a Turkish surname. Notable people with the surname include:

 Hayrullah Fişek (1885–1975), Turkish career officer
 Hicri Fişek (1918–2002), Turkish politician
 Nusret Fişek (1914–1990), Turkish government minister
 Şadan Fişek (1922–2002), Turkish politician

Turkish-language surnames